Sagar Assembly constituency is one of the 230 Vidhan Sabha (Legislative Assembly) constituencies of Madhya Pradesh state in central India. This constituency came into existence in 1951, as one of the 184 Vidhan Sabha constituencies of Madhya Pradesh state.

Overview
Sagar (constituency number 41) is one of the 8 Vidhan Sabha constituencies located in Sagar district. This constituency presently covers the Sagar Municipal Corporation and Gaurnagar Outgrowth of Sagar tehsil of the district.

Sagar is part of Sagar Lok Sabha constituency along with seven other Vidhan Sabha segments, namely, Bina, Surkhi, Naryoli and Khurai in this district and Kurwai, Sironj and Shamshabad in Vidisha district.

Members of Legislative Assembly
 1951: Mohammad Shafi Mohammad Subrati, Indian National Congress 
 1957: Mohammad Shafi Mohammad Subrati, Indian National Congress
 1962: Mohammad Shafi Mohammad Subrati, Indian National Congress
 1967: D. Jain, Indian National Congress
 1972: Jwalaprasad Jyotishi, Indian National Congress
 1977: Shivkumar Jwalaprasad, Indian National Congress
 1980: Shivkumar Jwalaprasad, Indian National Congress (I)
 1985: Prakash Motilal Jain, Indian National Congress (I)
 1990: Prakash Motilal Jain, Indian National Congress (I)
 1993: Sudha Jain, Bharatiya Janata Party
 1998: Sudha Jain, Bharatiya Janata Party
 2003: Sudha Jain, Bharatiya Janata Party
 2008: Shailendra Kumar Jain, Bharatiya Janata Party
 2013: Shailendra Kumar Jain, Bharatiya Janata Party
 2018:Shailendra Kumar Jain, Bharatiya Janata Party

See also
 Sagar

References

Sagar, Madhya Pradesh
Assembly constituencies of Madhya Pradesh
Sagar district